Raquel Romano (June 5, 1948 - October 22, 2022) was a Brazilian author and internet celebrity. Her works focused on elderly people with dementia, autistic adults, schizophrenics and transgender people.

Career 
Romano was born on Oliveira, Minas Gerais, Brazil. In addition to acting as an art therapist, producer and art educator, she was a professor at the Minas Gerais State University, focusing on creative expressions, pedagogy and andragogy. She was a member of the Romano family, one of the most famous cultural clans in Minas Gerais. Thus, she was the sister of researcher Demóstenes Romano and writer Olavo Romano, president emeritus of the Academia Mineira de Letras. Raquel Romano started production as an author and researcher in 1971 at the Fundação Universidade Mineira de Arte. At the time, he had drawing as an object of study. But, from 1990 onwards, it stood out when it dialogued with other forms of creation, such as theatre and music, to reflect on the role of art in education. In 2002, she became a member of Soka Gakkai International, an organization affiliated with the United Nations for Peace, Culture and Education. From then on, she included the bias of Soka Humanistic Education in her professional repertoire.

She wrote books like Alfabetização Cultural (2012), a work that discuss culture and education, and Expressão Criadora (2020), which addresses topics such as non-violent communication, intergenerational transmission, theatrical games and the relationship between art therapy and art education.

In 2020, she hosted the program De Brincadeira, on the YouTube channel Mundo Autista. In 2022, she appeared in the cast of the podcast Vozes da Maturidade, playing an elderly woman in search of an autism diagnosis.

References 

1948 births
2022 deaths
21st-century Brazilian writers
Brazilian Buddhists
Converts to Sōka Gakkai
Members of Sōka Gakkai
Brazilian Internet celebrities
21st-century Brazilian women writers